"Everybody Get Up" is a song by English boy band Five. It was released on 31 August 1998 as the fourth single from their debut studio album Five (1998). The song was written by Five, Herbie Crichlow, Alan Merrill and Jake Hooker and produced by Denniz Pop and Jake Schulze. Merrill and Hooker are credited as songwriters because the track contains samples from Joan Jett's "I Love Rock 'n' Roll". "Everybody Get Up" has received a gold certification for sales and streams of over 400,000 units in the United Kingdom, where it peaked at number two on 6 September 1998. Worldwide, the song topped the New Zealand Singles Chart and reached the top five in Australia, Ireland, Spain, and Sweden.

Music video
The music video starts off with a number of high school students preparing to take an exam in a large hall, which contains a stage. Just as they turn over their papers and begin writing, the teacher in charge, Mr McGarry, is told over the intercom to come to the headmaster's office. Mr McGarry says that he will be back in five minutes (around the length of video) and tells everyone to stay in their seats in silence. As soon as he leaves, one boy starts hitting his desk with a ruler and after a few seconds everyone else does the same on their own desks.

Five are then shown walking down the corridor behind the stage. Abs Breen pushes down on a lever on the wall, which dims the lights where they are and opens up the curtain. The music then starts and the students stand up, throw their papers in the air, knock their desks over and start throwing their chairs around. Girls with their hair tied back remove their hair ties to let their hair flow free. One girl also removes her glasses and throws her cardigan open. A massive party starts and the students dance with Five as they sing. Some of the male students do somersaults and breakdance and the Five boys jump high into the air at times as well. The band are showing wearing two different outfits each throughout the video.

During the chorus after the first verse, Scott Robinson takes a can of brown paint and Ritchie Neville takes a can of white paint, and they both throw their paint all over everyone. J Brown is held up by the crowd as he sings the second verse, during which more blue paint is thrown by Robinson and Neville. The students all imitate Five's moves during the chorus after the second verse. At the bridge, someone lights a lighter and holds it against the fire sprinkler on the ceiling. Water begins pouring down over everyone and drenches them, but doesn't wash the paint off.

By this time, none of Five have been covered with paint or water. Towards the end of the video, one girl, wet and drenched in paint, is sitting in her chair smiling and tapping a ruler against her desk (she may have not moved throughout the whole song). When the song ends, Mr McGarry turns the lever back up and returns to an empty, dirty room. He exclaims his disbelief at what he sees and the camera changes to a shot behind Five of them walking slowly back down the corridor behind the stage.

Track listings

UK CD1
 "Everybody Get Up" (radio edit)
 "My Song" (exclusive single remix)
 CD ROM

UK CD2
 "Everybody Get Up" (radio edit)
 "Everybody Get Up" (Johan S Toxic Rock mix)
 "Everybody Get Up" (Paul Masterson vocal mix)

UK cassette single
 "Everybody Get Up" (radio edit)
 "My Song" (exclusive single remix)
 "Everybody Get Up" (extended)

European CD single
 "Everybody Get Up" (radio edit)
 "My Song" (exclusive single remix)

Australian CD single
 "Everybody Get Up" (radio edit)
 "My Song" (exclusive single remix)
 "Everybody Get Up" (Johan S Toxic Rock mix)
 "Everybody Get Up" (Paul Masterson vocal mix)

Credits and personnel
Credits are lifted from the Five album booklet.

Studio
 Recorded at Cheiron Studios (Stockholm, Sweden)

Personnel
 Alan Merrill – writing
 Five – writing
 Jake Hooker – writing
 Herbie Crichlow – writing
 Denniz Pop – production
 Jake Schulze – production

Charts

Weekly charts

Year-end charts

Certifications and sales

Release history

References

External links
 

1998 singles
1998 songs
Bertelsmann Music Group singles
Five (band) songs
Number-one singles in New Zealand
RCA Records singles
Songs written by Abz Love
Songs written by Herbie Crichlow
Songs written by Jason "J" Brown
Songs written by Sean Conlon